Homodotis is a genus of moths in the family Geometridae erected by Edward Meyrick in 1885. All the species in this genus are endemic to New Zealand.

Taxonomy 
This genus was erected by Edward Meyrick in 1885 as a replacement name for Eurydice Meyrick as that name was preoccupied by the Crustacea genus Eurydice Leach, 1815. The type species is Eurydice cymosema (now known as H. falcata) by monotypy.

Species
Species found in this genus include:
Homodotis amblyterma (Meyrick, 1931)
Homodotis falcata (Butler, 1879)
Homodotis megaspilata (Walker, 1862)

References

Moths of New Zealand
Moth genera
Endemic fauna of New Zealand
Taxa named by Edward Meyrick
Endemic moths of New Zealand
Geometridae